The 1990 Centennial Cup is the 20th Junior "A" 1990 ice hockey National Championship for the Canadian Junior Hockey League.

The Centennial Cup was competed for by the winners of the Doyle Cup, Anavet Cup, Dudley Hewitt Cup, the Callaghan Cup, and a host city.

The tournament was hosted by the Vernon Lakers and Vernon, British Columbia.

The Playoffs

Round Robin

Results
Vernon Lakers defeated Longueuil Sieurs 6-1
Nipawin Hawks defeated Amherst Ramblers 4-3 in overtime
New Westminster Royals defeated Longueuil Sieurs 11-3
New Westminster Royals defeated Amherst Ramblers 9-0
Vernon Lakers defeated Nipawin Hawks 2-1 in overtime
Nipawin Hawks defeated Longueuil Sieurs 5-2
New Westminster Royals defeated Vernon Lakers 5-3
Vernon Lakers defeated Amherst Ramblers 8-2
Longueuil Sieurs defeated Amherst Ramblers 6-2
New Westminster Royals defeated Nipawin Hawks 3-2 for the Abbott Cup

Semi-finals and Final

Please note: Final was won in overtime.

Awards
Most Valuable Player: Marc Alain Duchaine (Longueuil Sieurs)
Top Scorer: Kelly Jones (New Westminster Royals)
Most Sportsmanlike Player: Kelly Jones (New Westminster Royals)

All-Star Team
Forward
Mark Karpen (New Westminster Royals)
David Oliver (Vernon Lakers)
Al Wonitowy (Nipawin Hawks)
Defence
Andrew Wolf (New Westminster Royals)
Dean Zayonce (Vernon Lakers)
Goal
Lauren Belland (Nipawin Hawks)

Roll of League Champions
AJHL: Calgary Canucks
BCJHL: New Westminster Royals
CJHL: Hawkesbury Hawks
IJHL: Charlottetown Abbies
MJHL: Portage Terriers
MVJHL: Amherst Ramblers
NOJHL: Sudbury Cubs
PCJHL: Prince George Spruce Kings
QPJHL: Longueuil Collège Français
SJHL: Nipawin Hawks
SJJHL: Avalon Jr. Capitals

See also
Canadian Junior A Hockey League
Royal Bank Cup
Anavet Cup
Doyle Cup
Dudley Hewitt Cup
Fred Page Cup
Abbott Cup
Mowat Cup

External links
Royal Bank Cup Website

1990
Cup
Sport in Vernon, British Columbia